Jabberwock is a 1972 play by American playwrights Jerome Lawrence and Robert E. Lee, a semi-biographical account of the childhood of author/cartoonist/playwright James Thurber. It focuses on his early life and his eccentric family as they live through World War I.

Plays by Robert E. Lee (playwright)
1972 plays